Charqueada is a municipality in the state of São Paulo in Brazil. The population is 17,367 (2020 est.) in an area of 176 km². The elevation is 610 m.

References

Municipalities in São Paulo (state)